This is a list of international television programs which first aired on Australian television in 2008. The list is arranged chronological order. Where more than one program debuted on the same date, those programs are listed alphabetically.

Premieres

Free-to-air television

Subscription television

Notes

References

2008 in Australian television
Premieres